Lucy Meadows was a transgender teacher from Accrington in the United Kingdom. She died by suicide in March 2013 after the decision of her employers to allow her to return to work after gender reassignment surgery was covered in the national press.

Meadows grew up in a Christian family and married her partner Ruth Smith in 2009, prior to transitioning. Meadows and Smith separated in 2011, and at Christmas 2012, Meadows told her school about the transition. According to Smith, "The school had no difficulty with that. They put out a letter to parents explaining this – and that was their great mistake." The letter became a topic of local press interest, and then national news.

Writing in The Guardian, Paris Lees stated that Meadows had been "persecuted by the press" after her local newspaper reported on her transition.

On 3 January 2013, Meadows complained to the Press Complaints Commission (PCC) of "harassment from the press", and specifically an article written by Richard Littlejohn in the Daily Mail on 20 December 2012, headlined "He's not only in the wrong body … he's in the wrong job". Littlejohn asked readers about the "devastating effect" which Meadows' gender reassignment could have on her pupils. A petition drive was launched demanding Littlejohn be sacked. Two petitions signed by over 240,000 people were handed over to the Daily Mail offices.

In March 2013, Meadows was found dead as a result of carbon monoxide poisoning. At the inquest into Meadows' death, the coroner criticised the press for their handling of the story. According to the Guardian, he "singled out the Daily Mail as he accused the paper of 'ridicule and humiliation' and a 'character assassination' of Lucy Meadows". The coroner recommended that guidelines about press intrusion into the lives of the public be tightened.

References

British women
LGBT-related suicides
Transgender women
1981 births
2013 suicides
English LGBT people
Suicides by carbon monoxide poisoning
Suicides in England